Playdom was an online social network game developer popular on Facebook, Google+ and Myspace. The company was founded in the San Francisco Bay Area by University of California, Berkeley graduates Ling Xiao and Chris Wang and Swarthmore College graduate Dan Yue. In 2009, the market for games played on social networking sites was valued at $300 million, consisting mostly of online sales of virtual goods.

It was a wholly owned subsidiary of Disney Interactive, itself a division of The Walt Disney Company. On September 1, 2016, Disney announced the closure of the remaining Playdom games, Marvel: Avengers Alliance and its mobile sequel at the end of the month, effectively shuttering the studio.

History
On November 12, 2009, Playdom acquired Green Patch and Trippert Labs. In September 2009, competitor Zynga initiated a trade secrets lawsuits against Playdom and 22 other rivals, including Green Patch. These lawsuits were finally settled in November 2010, less than 4 months after Disney's acquisition of Playdom in July 2010.

On March 31, 2010, Playdom announced the acquisition of Argentina-based online game developer Three Melons for an undisclosed amount. In April 2010, Playdom closed all but one of the games from the Green Patch studio six months post-acquisition. On April 26, 2010, Playdom announced the acquisition of Merscom, a North Carolina-based social game developer. On May 19, 2010, they acquired Acclaim Games. On June 7, 2010, Playdom announced the acquisition of gaming developer Hive7 after a $33 million funding round. This marked Playdom's sixth acquisition over the prior year. On July 8, 2010, Playdom announced it acquired Metaplace, Inc. The pricing of the deal was not disclosed.

On July 27, 2010, The Walt Disney Company acquired Playdom in a $763 million deal. Disney initially paid $563 million for Playdom, which was the No. 3 social game company with about 42 million monthly players at the time of the acquisition. The deal also included a further $200 million in additional payments if Playdom achieves certain growth thresholds.

In May 2011, Playdom has been ordered by the Federal Trade Commission to pay $3 million in fines for collecting and disclosing children's information without parental approval.

In April 2014, Playdom announced the closure of all online games on the Playdom site, including Gardens of Time, Marvel: Avengers Alliance, Kitchen Scramble, Pirates of the Caribbean: Isles of War, Ghosts of Mistwood, Disney City Girl, and Disney Words of Wonder. The games closed on April 25, 2014. RockYou acquired the Facebook games Gardens of Time, Words of Wonder, and Disney City Girl (renamed to City Girl Life).

On September 1, 2016, Disney Interactive Media Group announced the end of Marvel: Avengers Alliance and its mobile-only sequel, Marvel: Avengers Alliance 2, bringing a close to the studio.

Games

Gardens of Time was the most successful Facebook game created by Playdom, with a peak of 17 million monthly active users and 4 million daily active users.

Sold Games
The following games were sold to RockYou between April and October 2014.
Disney City Girl (now renamed "City Girl Life")
Disney Words of Wonder (now renamed "Words of Wonder")
Gardens of Time
Kitchen Scramble

Discontinued games
Guardians of the Galaxy: The Universal Weapon (GotG)
Social City – A casual strategy game in which the player develops a city. Social City won the 2010 Game Developers Choice Online Award for Best Social Network Game. Inside Social Games rated Social City as the #2 Best Facebook Game of the first half of 2010. Social City also received an honorable mention on Gamasutra's list of the Top 5 Facebook Social Games in 2010. Gamezebo rated Social City at 3.5 out of 5, highlighting balanced gameplay and "adorable" graphics. However, it was criticized for its lack of complexity: "Once you’ve mastered the game’s ecosystem of manufacturing/residential/leisure, all you’ll be doing is visiting your town to keep this balance in check and grow your city. Growing your city remains exciting throughout, but by the time you hit level 15 or so you just start wishing there was something more." Social City was closed on December 20, 2011.
Armies of Magic
Big City Life
Blackwood & Bell Mysteries
Bloodlines
Bola
Botkin's Hidden Cove
City of Wonder
Deep Realms
Disney Animal Kingdom Explorers
Disney Dream Kingdom
Disney Ghosts of Mistwood
Disney Gnome Town
Disney Hidden Worlds
Disney Club Penguin: Card-Jitsu Snow
ESPNU College Town
ESPN Return Man
ESPN Sports Bar & Grill
Fanglies
Fish Friends
Full Bloom
The Incredible Machine
(Lil) Farm Life
(Lil) Green Patch
Market Street
Marvel: Avengers Alliance
Marvel: Avengers Alliance 2
Marvel: Avengers Alliance Tactics
Mobsters - Facebook
Mobsters - MySpace
Mobsters: Overdrive
Mobsters 2: Vendetta
Mobsters: Criminal Empire
My Vineyard
NBA Dynasty
Pet Resort
Pirates of the Caribbean: Isles of War
Poker Palace
ScribbleMix 
Sorority Life
Star Wars Commander
Threads of Mystery
Tiki Farm
Tiki Resort
Treetopia
Verdonia
Wild Ones

Sorority Life

Sorority Life was an online role-playing game published by Playdom on the social media platforms Facebook and Myspace in 2008. Each player assumed the role of a college sorority sister striving to increase her social status by improving her employment and wardrobe, the giving of gifts, and other activities.

By the summer of 2009, Steve Meretzky, a contributor to the game and Vice-President of Game Design at Playdom at the time, wrote that Sorority Life had three million monthly active users. By May 2010, Sorority Life had over 5 million monthly active users, and 600,000-700,000 daily users, on Facebook.

On December 23, 2013, Sorority Life announced an "extended downtime" on its Facebook page, and on January 8, 2014, announced that the game would be permanently shut down.

References

External links 

 Official website

Disney Interactive
Defunct video game companies of the United States
Video game development companies
Virtual economies
Software companies based in the San Francisco Bay Area
Companies based in Palo Alto, California
Defunct companies based in the San Francisco Bay Area
American companies established in 2008
Video game companies established in 2008
Video game companies disestablished in 2016
2008 establishments in California
2016 disestablishments in California
Disney acquisitions